

The Levasseur PL.3 AM3 was a carrier-based reconnaissance aircraft produced in France in the 1920s to fulfill a specification for a three-seat carrier-borne reconnaissance aircraft. The PL.3 AM3, a biplane of all-wood construction did not enter production and only the prototype was built.

Specifications

See also

References

1920s French military reconnaissance aircraft
Carrier-based aircraft
Levasseur aircraft
Biplanes
Single-engined tractor aircraft
Aircraft first flown in 1924